The 1964 Buenos Aires Grand Prix was a motor race held at the Autódromo Juan y Óscar Gálvez circuit on February 16, 1964.

Classification

References

Buenos Aires Grand Prix
1964 in motorsport
1964 in Argentine motorsport
February 1964 sports events in South America